Kashi From Village (also known as Kashi) is a 2005 Indian Kannada-language action drama film directed by Om Sai Prakash featuring Sudeep and Rakshita in the lead roles. The film features background score and soundtrack composed by Koti and lyrics by K. Kalyan. The film released on 1 April 2005. The film is a remake of the Tamil film Bagavathi (2002).

Plot 
Kashi owns a tea shop and lives with his younger brother Vishwa. He meets a girl named Anjali. She ends up appreciating his kindness, and they fall in love. Vishwa has a girlfriend named Priya, with whom he secretly develops a intimate relationship. However, Vishwa and Priya's relationship is objected by Priya's father PR, a business magnate. Kashi tries to convince PR, but is humiliated. Vishwa and Priya elope, but PR kills Guna.

Kashi mourns over Vishwa's death, who promises he will be with his brother forever in his last moment. After Vishwa's death, Kashi learns that Priya is pregnant with Vishwa's child and becomes happy that Vishwa will be coming back as a child. However, PR attempts to kill the child before birth, but Kashi challenges him, saying the child will touch the earth. In order to accomplish Kashi's vengeance, Sethu helps him turn into a gangster. With the help of Anjali, Kashi overcomes all hurdles by PR and manages to protect Priya to allow for the safe birth of his brother's child. PR later realizes his mistake and apologizes to Kashi.

Cast
 Sudeep as Kashi
 Rakshita as Anjali
 Satya Prakash as PR
 Harsha as Vishwa
 Bank Janardhan
 Dharma
 Sara Shivakumar

Soundtrack

Music by Koti. The song "Maguve Naguthiru" is a remake of composer's own Telugu song "Kadile Kalama" from Pedarayudu.

References

External links
 

2005 films
2000s Kannada-language films
Kannada remakes of Tamil films
Indian action drama films
2000s masala films
Films directed by Sai Prakash
2005 action drama films